Ruge is a German surname, often found in the Grand Est region of France. Notable people with the surname include:

 Arnold Ruge (1802-1889), German philosopher
 Arthur Claude Ruge (1905-2000), American engineer and inventor
 Billy Ruge (c.1866/1870–1955), American actor
 Carl Arnold Ruge (1846-1926), German pathologist
 Daniel Ruge (1917-2005), American neurosurgeon and White House physician
 Friedrich Ruge (1894-1985), German naval officer
 Georg Ruge (1852-1919), German anatomist
 George H. Ruge (1921–2011), American radio personality
 Gerd Ruge (soldier) (1913–1997), highly decorated German soldier
 Gerd Ruge (1928–2021), German journalist
 Gesine Ruge, German canoer
 Nina Ruge (born 1956), German journalist
 Otto Ruge (1882-1961), Norwegian general